Policy transfer is a process in which knowledge about policies, administrative arrangements, institutions and ideas in one political setting (past or present) is used in the development of policies, administrative arrangements, institutions and ideas in another political setting. Policy transfer has a long history with a variety of policies such as zero tolerance policing, welfare-to-work and Business Improvement Districts moving between different nation states.

Academic research on policy transfer
Policy transfer has been the subject of considerable academic research, led primarily by political scientists since the late 1990s.  Since the mid-2000s geographers have also played an important role in these debates (often use the term policy mobilities instead of policy transfer).

Since David Dolowitz and David Marsh's (2000) paper 'Learning from abroad: the role of policy transfer in contemporary policy-making', academic research has focused on the issues of who is involved in policy transfer, what is transferred, from and to where policy is transferred, the degrees of and constraints on transfer, and its success once transferred. More recently there have been attempts to explicate the role of two way communication, and particularly feedback from policy stakeholders for successful policy transfer,  along with efforts to acknowledge the "indigenization" of policies as they are modified and adapted to context.  The debates in geography have focused on the technologies and methods through which policies and ideas circulate – such as study tours, conferences and best practice guides – as well as looking at how and why the policies change form as they circulate.

References

External links
 Imagining Urban Futures: Policy transfer and urban policy mobilities research website

Policy